Amanda Elmore (born March 13, 1991) is an American rower. She won the gold medal in the quad sculls at the 2015 World Rowing Championships and won the gold medal at the 2016 Summer Olympics in the Woman's eight. Elmore graduated from Harrison High School in West Lafayette, Indiana in 2009, and earned a biology degree from Purdue University in 2013. She is the granddaughter of William Cronk Elmore.

References

External links
 

1991 births
Living people
American female rowers
People from West Lafayette, Indiana
World Rowing Championships medalists for the United States
Purdue University alumni
Rowers at the 2016 Summer Olympics
Olympic gold medalists for the United States in rowing
Medalists at the 2016 Summer Olympics
21st-century American women